Prohercostomus is an extinct genus of flies in the family Dolichopodidae, known from Baltic amber from the Eocene. It was originally created as a subgenus of Hercostomus, but was later raised to genus rank.

Species
†Prohercostomus bickeli (Evenhuis, 1994)
†Prohercostomus interceptus (Meunier, 1907)
†Prohercostomus intremulus (Meunier, 1907)
†Prohercostomus meunierianus (Evenhuis, 1994)
†Prohercostomus monotonus (Meunier, 1907)
†Prohercostomus negotiosus (Meunier, 1907)
†Prohercostomus noxialis (Meunier, 1907) (synonym: Sympycnites primaevus Grimaldi & Cumming, 1999)

References

†
†
 Prehistoric Diptera genera
Baltic amber
Eocene insects